Salomé is a Mexican telenovela produced by Juan Osorio for Televisa in 2001. It is the third remake of La Colorina.

On Monday, October 22, 2001, Canal de las Estrellas started broadcasting Salomé weekdays at 8:00pm, replacing La intrusa. The last episode was broadcast on Friday, May 17, 2002 with La Otra replacing it the following Monday.

The series stars Edith González, Guy Ecker, Sebastián Ligarde, Mónika Sánchez and Niurka.

Plot
It is 1980 in Mexico City, where there are millions of people who dream of a better life, while others cry and suffer for their lost well-being.

In the D'Ruby cabaret lives Salomé (Edith González), she is the main dancer of the show; her beauty and sensuality captivate the audience. Salomé and Karicia (Niurka) are two supportive friends through thick and thin. Together with Yolanda (Yolanda Montes "Tongolele"), the owner of the place, who in her time was known as the "Queen of the Night", they are the soul and motor of the cabaret.

The dressing room is Salomé's refuge. Surrounded by lights, feathers and sequins, it would seem that her life is a constant party, but it is not. She found in dance a way to understand life, to challenge the past. She maintains an internal fight that does not end; since she was a child, she got to know pain due to the abandonment of her parents. She was tricked in love and has survived in a hostile world. "El Figurín" (Roberto Palazuelos) is the heartthrob of the neighborhood. He is violent, macho and in love with Salomé, but she breaks up the relationship because she dreams of true love.

Near the cabaret there is a neighborhood where a series of characters live: There we get to know Kikis (Rosita Pelayo), a gossipy but cooperative woman; Hipólito (Jaime Garza), who is a plumber, but laziness and the inability to think about the future have made him mediocre; Marta (Paty Díaz), his wife, wants a better life, has aspirations and feels that her marriage is dying. Piro (Carlos Eduardo Rico), Marta's brother, lives with them. He is very similar to Hipólito, they spend their time joking and playing, as if they didn't take life seriously. Lola (Leticia Perdigón) sells fayuca and, together with "El Figurín", she controls a gang. She falls in love with David (Milton Cortés), who has a secret and will be Lola's downfall.

On the other side of the city, in a mansion, lives the Montesino family: Julio (Guy Ecker) and Ángela (Mónika Sánchez) are married. She is a sick woman and her husband faces the problem and patiently bears the eventful marital life he is forced to live. Lucrecia (María Rubio), Julio's mother, thinks that Ángela, being sterile, represents an obstacle for the family. Accustomed to dominate and to modify wills, she will twist Julio's destiny until she achieves her longed-for grandson.

Arturo (Aarón Hernán), Lucrecia's husband, has assumed his life as a faithful and good husband. He accepts Lucrecia's feminine strength because he loves her and prefers to live in peace. He is an understanding father and wants to keep the family together. Manola (Patricia Reyes Spíndola) is a strong woman, she faces Lucrecia, she does not allow Ángela to be hurt. She is the guardian angel of the Montesino family. She has dedicated her life to the service of the family, she represents balance and good sense.

Diego (Sebastián Ligarde), Ángela's half brother, lives with them. He is a playboy, partygoer and regular client of the D'Ruby cabaret. On a drunken night, Diego arrives at the mansion accompanied by Salomé and Karicia.

It is fate that leads Salomé by the hand to meet Julio. One look, one kiss and they will no longer be able to leave each other. Secretly, far away, they will consummate their deep, but forbidden love... Salomé will have to face adverse and painful situations.

Cast
First part

Edith Gonzalez as Fernanda Quiñones "Salomé"
Guy Ecker as Julio Montesino Limantour
Sebastián Ligarde as Diego Duval
Mónika Sánchez as Ángela Duval de Montesino
María Rubio as Doña Lucrecia Limantour de Montesino
Patricia Reyes Spíndola as Manola
Aarón Hernán as Don Arturo Montesino
Raúl Ramírez as Dr. Íñigo
Niurka as Karicia de Cisneros / Platonia
Yolanda Montes "Tongolele" as Yolanda
Leticia Perdigón as Lola
Jaime Garza as Hipólito
Paty Díaz as Marta
Julián Bravo as Guillermo
Katie Barberi as Laura de Cansino
Juan Imperio as Animador
Roberto Palazuelos as Humberto Treviño "Beto" "El Figurín"
Rodrigo Vidal as Danny / Soraya
Carlos Eduardo Rico as Piro
Rosita Pelayo as Kikis
Andrés García Jr. as Víctor
Fernando Robles as Pancho
Iliana de la Garza as Leonor
Thelma Tixou as Teporocha
José Roberto Cantoral as Lucho
Milton Cortés as David "El Matador"
Raúl Castellanos as Juanito
Romina Dos Pasos as Lupita
Carlos González as Cairo
Luis Romo as Manotas
Damián Sarka as Diente de Oro
Leo Navarro as Caritas
Arturo Guízar as Abel
Julián Pastor as Lic. Arango

Second part

Edith Gonzalez as Fernanda Quiñones de Lavalle "Salomé"
Guy Ecker as Julio Montesino Limantour
Sebastián Ligarde as Diego Duval
Niurka as Karicia de Cisneros / Platonia
María Rubio as Doña Lucrecia Limantour de Montesino
Aarón Hernán as Don Arturo Montesino
Patricia Reyes Spíndola as Manola
Raúl Ramírez as Dr. Íñigo
Julián Bravo as Guillermo
Roberto Vander as Mauricio Valdivia
Jaime Garza as Hipólito
Ernesto D'Alessio as José Miguel Lavalle
José María Torre as José Armando Lavalle
Rafael Amaya as José Julián Lavalle
Alejandra Procuna as Rebeca Santos
Rosita Pelayo as Kikis
Carlos Eduardo Rico as Piro
Alessandra Rosaldo as Karla Cansino
Zully Keith as Rosario
Arturo Guízar as Abel
Marco Uriel as Roberto
Jacqueline Arroyo as Irma
Antonio Brenan as Chava
Jorge Brenan as Nacho
Pablo Cheng as Willy
Christian Ruiz as Aldo
Yuliana Peniche as Money
Kelchie Arizmendi as Natalia
Thaily Amezcua as Romina
Damián Mendiola as Mauro
Alberto Salaberry as Juan "Juanito" Pérez
Carmen Becerra as Diana
Iliana de la Garza as Leonor
Milton Cortés as David "El Matador"

Awards and nominations

International Broadcasters of Salomé 

North & South America, Caribbean

Europe, Africa, Asia, Oceania

DVD releases

Region 2
Pandastorm Pictures started to release the series in Germany on May 8, 2015. The first volume, a 10 DVD box set, consists of episode 1 – 50 and is CODEFREE, sound: German DD 2.0, Spanish DD 2.0

References

External links

2001 telenovelas
Mexican telenovelas
2001 Mexican television series debuts
2002 Mexican television series endings
Television shows set in Mexico City
Televisa telenovelas
Mexican television series based on Chilean television series
Spanish-language telenovelas